Braising (from the French word braiser) is a combination-cooking method that uses both wet and dry heats: typically, the food is first browned at a high temperature, then simmered in a covered pot in cooking liquid (such as wine, broth, coconut milk or beer). It is similar to stewing, but braising is done with less liquid and usually used for larger cuts of meat. Braising of meat is often referred to as pot roasting, though some authors make a distinction between the two methods, based on whether additional liquid is added. Osso buco and coq au vin are well known braised meat dishes, and the technique can also be used to prepare fish, tempeh, tofu or fruits and vegetables.

Method
Braising relies on heat, time, and moisture to break down the tough connective tissue (collagen) that binds together the muscle fibers in meat, making it an ideal way to cook tougher, more affordable cuts. Many classic braised dishes (e.g., coq au vin) are highly evolved methods of cooking tough and otherwise unpalatable foods. Both pressure cooking and slow cooking (e.g. in a crockpot) are forms of braising.

Techniques
Most braises follow the same basic steps. The food to be braised (meats, vegetables, mushrooms, etc.) is first pan-seared to brown its surface and enhance its flavor (through the Maillard reaction). If the food will not produce enough liquid of its own, a certain amount of cooking liquid that often includes an acidic element (e.g., tomatoes, beer, balsamic vinegar, wine) is added to the pot, often with stock. A classic braise is done with a relatively whole cut of meat, and the braising liquid will cover two-thirds of the food in the pan. The dish is then covered and cooked at a very low simmer until the meat becomes so tender that it can be "cut" with just the gentlest of pressure from a fork (versus a knife).  Often the cooking liquid is finished to create a sauce or gravy as well.

Sometimes foods with high water content (particularly vegetables) can be cooked in their own juices, making the addition of liquid unnecessary.

A successful braise intermingles the flavors of the foods being cooked with those of the cooking liquid. This cooking method dissolves the meat's collagen into gelatin, which can greatly enrich and thicken the liquid. Braising is economical (as it allows the use of tough and inexpensive cuts), and efficient (as it often enables an entire meal to be prepared in a single pot or pan).

Braised foods
Braised dishes often familiar to Westerners include pot roast, red braised pork belly, Swiss steak, chicken cacciatore, goulash, carbonade flamande, coq au vin, sauerbraten, beef bourguignon, beef brisket, oxtail, and tajines, among others. 

Braising is used extensively in the cuisines of Asia, particularly Chinese cuisine, Vietnamese cuisine and Taiwanese cuisine, where soy sauce (or in Vietnam, soy sauce and fish sauce) is often added to the braising liquid.

See also

 Adobo
 Hot pot
 Jorim
 Jugging
 Kho (cooking technique)
 Lancashire hotpot
 Lou mei
 Pot roast
 Red cooking
 Stew

References

Cooking techniques
Culinary terminology